Sándor Puhl (14 July 1955 – 20 May 2021) was a Hungarian football referee, mostly known for supervising four matches in the 1994 FIFA World Cup in the United States, including the final between Brazil and Italy. He also refereed UEFA Champions League matches, including the 1997 UEFA Champions League Final between Borussia Dortmund and Juventus. Dortmund ended up being 3–1 winners.

He was elected as IFFHS' World's Best Referee of the Year four times in a row between 1994 and 1997.

After retiring as a referee, he was Deputy Chairman of the Hungarian Football Association from 2000 to 2006. He also worked as a co-commentator for a Hungarian sports TV channel.

Puhl spoke Hungarian, German, Italian and English.

Puhl died on 20 May 2021, at the age of 65, from post-COVID-19 complications during the COVID-19 pandemic in Hungary.

References

External links
 Profile 

1955 births
2021 deaths
Hungarian football referees
UEFA Champions League referees
FIFA World Cup referees
FIFA World Cup Final match officials
1994 FIFA World Cup referees
People from Miskolc
UEFA Euro 1992 referees
UEFA Euro 1996 referees
Deaths from the COVID-19 pandemic in Hungary